Obid Agzamovich Asomov (October 22, 1963 – December 14, 2018) was an Uzbek comedian actor. Participant of the humorous TV show Crooked Mirror aired on the channel Russia-1. Honored Artist of the Republic of Uzbekistan (1996).

Biography  
Studied at the Art college named Benkov, graduated with honors. The next year, Obid entered the art department of the Tashkent Theater Institute, which he never graduated from.
During his studies, Obid worked as a tamada, gave humorous concerts in houses of culture and clubs. Once one of his concerts was attended by director Latif Fayziev, who was working at that time on the Soviet-Indian film ″By the Law of the Jungle″. After the filming of the debut film, offers from other directors fell in, and with the advent of popularity, endless tours of Uzbekistan began.
In 2000, Farrukh Zokirov invited Obid to work as a presenter for the Yalla group on tour in Germany. The humorist-presenter visited 29 cities in Germany from Frankfurt to Hamburg within a month.
In the late 2000s, the famous comedian Yevgeny Petrosyan invited Obid Asomov to perform on stage together. The actor has since appeared on the TV show Crooked Mirror.
On May 24, 2018, he was appointed director of the State Unitary Enterprise ″Animation filmlar studiosi″ (Studio of animated films) at the Uzbekfilm film studio.
On December 11, 2018, Obid Asomov was admitted to the 1st Clinical Hospital with a diagnosis of Ischemic heart disease, acute attack, arrhythmic shock. Despite the medical assistance provided, the actor died at the age of 56 in the hospital at 17:30 on December 14, 2018.
On December 15, he was buried in the Kamalan cemetery. Hundreds of Tashkent residents came to say goodbye to the artist.

Filmography 
 1989 – Sherali and Oybarchin
 1990 – Bu nima boo or hara-kiri versus King Kong
 1990 – The Potter and the Pot – Husan, the Rogue and the Deceiver
 1991 – Iron Man (Temir Erkak) – a colleague
 1991 – Cammy – Entertainer
 1991 – By the Law of the Jungle – Circus Director
 1992 – Alif Leila
 1998 – Adorable baby with a heart of gold
 2000 – Alpomysh
 2000 – Tahir and Zuhra (new version)
 2001 – Woe, misfortune
 2003 – The Giant and the Shorty – Zulfikar
 2008 – Adventures in Chatrang Country
 2009 – This crazy, crazy, crazy movie – Chief

Family 
Asomov was married with four children. The elder brother Sobit Asomov was also an actor, comedian and comedian. Together they often performed and acted in films.

Awards  
Order Fidokorona xizmatlari uchun (2021, posthumously)
Honored Artist of the Republic of Uzbekistan (1996)

References

External links  
 Obid Asomov – Uzbek woman
 Obid Asomov. Best performances. Humor. Fun.
 Obid Asomov – Uzbek guest
 Obid Asomov – Philosophy
 Obid Asomov – Guest worker
 Obid Asomov Wife
 

1963 births
2018 deaths
Russian male television actors
Soviet male television actors
Russian humour
Actors from Tashkent
Soviet male film actors
Uzbekistani male film actors
Uzbekistani television presenters
Russian television presenters
21st-century Uzbekistani male actors